Çavdır is a town in Burdur Province in the Mediterranean region of Turkey. It is the seat of Çavdır District. Its population is 4,950 (2021).

References

Populated places in Çavdır District
Towns in Turkey